The 1987 season was the Washington Redskins' strike-shortened 56th season in the National Football League (NFL), their 52nd in Washington, D.C. and their seventh under head coach Joe Gibbs. The season was a shortened season due to the 1987 NFL strike.

The team had finished second in the NFC East the previous season with a 12–4 record. Games to be played during the third week of the season were canceled, and replacement players were used to play games from weeks 4 through 6.

The Redskins won the NFC East with an 11–4 record. The Redskins defeated the Denver Broncos 42–10 to win Super Bowl XXII. It was the Redskins' second Super Bowl win in six seasons, and coincidentally, their second Super Bowl win in a strike-season.

Redskins quarterback Doug Williams became the first black quarterback to start in a Super Bowl and was the only one to have emerged victorious until Russell Wilson won Super Bowl XLVIII with the Seattle Seahawks.

By virtue of the Redskins' 17-10 victory over Minnesota in the NFC title game, head coach Joe Gibbs earned his 10th playoff victory. He surpassed the legendary Vince Lombardi, who had retired after his 9th playoff victory and (coincidentally) later coached the Redskins for one season. Also ironic was the rumor that, following a disastrous 5-9-1 season, Green Bay would hire Gibbs to replace the dismissed Forrest Gregg. However, after the game, Gibbs would deny that he was interested.

While the replacement Skins all received large playoff shares for their part in the 1987 season, the only replacement player to receive a Super Bowl ring was wide receiver Anthony Allen, because he was on the active roster during the postseason (and made one reception in the NFC title game vs. Minnesota). On March 8, 2018,  the Redskins announced that they would honor the replacement players from the 1987 team with Super Bowl XXII rings.

Offseason

NFL draft

Personnel

Staff

NFL replacement players
After the league decided to use replacement players during the NFLPA strike, the following team was assembled:

Roster

Pre season

Regular season
In 1987, Redskins starting QB Jay Schroeder got injured early in the opening game against the Eagles and was replaced by Williams, who led the team to victory.
In his NFL debut, replacement player Ed Rubbert passed for 334 yards. Rubbert also threw three touchdown passes to Anthony Allen. Allen would have 255 receiving yards.

Schedule

Game summaries

Week 1

Week 2

Week 3 (Canceled)

Week 4

Week 5

Week 6

Week 7

Week 8

Week 9

Week 10

Week 11

Week 12

Week 13

Week 14

Week 15

Week 16

Standings

Playoffs

Notes:

 All times are EASTERN time.

Playoff game summaries

1987 NFC Divisional Playoffs

1987 NFC Championship Game

Super Bowl XXII

Awards and honors
 Charles Mann, Pro Bowl selection

References

Washington
Washington Redskins seasons
NFC East championship seasons
National Football Conference championship seasons
Super Bowl champion seasons
Wash